The 1960 Montana gubernatorial election took place on November 8, 1960. Incumbent Governor of Montana J. Hugo Aronson, who was first elected governor in 1952 and was re-elected in 1956, declined to run for re-election. Donald Grant Nutter, a former state senator, narrowly won the Republican primary, and advanced to the general election, where he was opposed by Paul Cannon, the Lieutenant Governor of Montana and the Democratic nominee. Nutter defeated Cannon by a fairly wide margin, winning his one and only term as governor, as he would die just a year into his term.

Democratic primary

Candidates
Paul Cannon, Lieutenant Governor of Montana
Jack Toole, former Chairman of the Montana Democratic Party
Mike Kuchera, furniture dealer
Willard E. Fraser, businessman
John M. Nickey
Merrill K. Riddick

Results

Republican primary

Candidates
Donald Grant Nutter, Chairman of the Montana Republican Party, former State Senator
Wesley A. D'Ewart, former United States Congressman from Montana's 2nd congressional district, 1954 Republican nominee for the United States Senate

Results

General election

Results

References

Montana
Gubernatorial
1960
November 1960 events in the United States